HC Victoria-Berestie is a handball club from Brest, Belarus. It currently competes in the Belarusian Women's Handball Championship, the Cup of Belarus and the Domestic - Brest Christmas Cup.

Head coaches
2020 -  Vasil Kozar

European Cups performance

Accomplishments
Women's EHF Challenge Cup:
 1/8 (1x): 2011/12, 2020/21

Belarusian Women's Handball Championship:
 3rd place (2x ): 2017, 2021

Other
Best striker of Belarus:
1x: 2017 - Elena Alekseyuk 310 goals

Performance history

References

Belarusian handball clubs
Sport in Brest, Belarus